This is a list of active and extinct volcanoes in Nicaragua.

Volcanoes

See also

 Central America Volcanic Arc
 List of volcanoes in Costa Rica
 List of volcanoes in El Salvador
 List of volcanoes in Guatemala
 List of volcanoes in Honduras
 List of volcanoes in Panama

References 

Nicaragua
 
Volcanoes